Marianna High School is a public high school in Marianna, Florida.  It enrolls 657 students in grades 9–12, and is the largest of five high schools in the Jackson County School Board.  It is accredited by Southern Association of Colleges and Schools.

The school's mission statement is: Marianna High School, in partnership with parents and community, will prepare its students to achieve learning, thinking, and life skills necessary to become successful, respectful and productive citizens in today's diverse society through challenging and equitable learning experiences.

Marianna High School offers technical and academic courses, dual enrollment, early admission to Chipola College, and in 2007 became the only school in the district to offer Advanced Placement.

History
Marianna High School was built in 1926.

In 1939, about 500 students walked out of their classes in protest after the school board failed to reappoint their principal, E.T. Denmark.  The students marched along city streets carrying placards and refused to return to class until their principal was reappointed.

Fire destroyed the school's industrial arts building in 1970.  No one was injured, and faulty wiring was blamed.

The school gained media attention in 1972 after 5 black students were expelled following a fight.  This led to a protest march on the state capital, and brought focus to racial tensions at the school.

In 1987, a student was stabbed to death during a fight with a classmate, and the following year a student was found in possession of a handgun and crack cocaine.  As a result, principals in all Jackson County high schools were provided with metal detectors.

Construction of a new Marianna High School began in 2001, and was completed in June 2005. The following month, prior to opening to students, the new school—equipped with standby generators and designed to withstand a category 5 hurricane—sheltered evacuees fleeing Hurricane Dennis.

In 2019 Marianna High School received a prank call from an unknown person claiming to be a student’s aunt and told the administration that the student had a “bong” in his backpack. Unable to understand the caller completely the administration thought the caller said “bomb” and had the whole school evacuated to the practice football field and took the student into custody and searched in the principals office only to find nothing in his backpack. They soon realized that it was a prank call and they let the student go and the incident was resolved. But even after the incident many students and teachers still refer this as the “Bong Threat” of Marianna High School.

Extracurricular activities

 Afro-Activette (no longer running)
Anchor Club
 Band
 Chorus (no longer running)
 Debating Club (founded in 2006, end date unknown)
 Fellowship of Christian Athletes
 Florida Forensic League
 Future Business Leaders of America
 Future Farmers of America
 Green Teen Organization (founded in 2007)
 Majaflo Yearbook
 National Beta Club
 National Honor Society
 Physics Club (no longer running)
 Student Government Association
 The Growler student newspaper (no longer running)
Thespian Club (no longer running)
 Technology Student Association
 The Diversity Club

Sports teams
 Baseball
 Basketball
 Cheerleading
 Cross Country
 Cricket
 Football
 Golf
 Soccer
 Softball
 Track & Field
 Girls Volleyball
 Weightlifting
 Wrestling
 Girls Wrestling 
 E Sports 
 Bass Fishing 
 Boys Volleyball 
 Girls Beach Volleyball 
 Water Polo
 Tennis 
 Lacrosse 
 Curling 
 Archery

Dawg Bytes 
Marianna High School had a weekly show named Dawg Bytes that aired on Fridays. Dawg Bytes was Discontinued during the 2020-21 school year but is still listed on the school website with all episodes still available to watch.

Notable alumni 
 Marvin Harvey, professional football player.
 James W. Kynes, professional football player, lawyer, corporate executive, and Florida Attorney General.
 Jeff Mathis, professional baseball player.
 Bud Whitehead, professional football player.

References

External links

Marianna High School
Jackson County School Board

High schools in Jackson County, Florida
Public high schools in Florida